Doll Domination is the second and most recent studio album by American girl group the Pussycat Dolls, released on September 19, 2008, by Interscope Records. The album's release was preceded by the departure of the group's longest-standing member Carmit Bachar. Development began in February 2008 where the group worked with previous collaborators Sean Garrett, Polow da Don and Timbaland and new ones such as Darkchild, J-Roc and Chase N. Cashe. Polow da Don, R. Kelly and Snoop Dogg also make guest performances on the album. Several songs on Doll Domination were originally recorded for the lead singer Nicole Scherzinger's debut solo album, Her Name is Nicole, which was shelved after the under-performance of its preceding singles.

The album consists of a mixture of pop and R&B songs that also blend elements of dance, electropop with lyrics that tackle fame, sexuality and relationships. All of the lead and background vocals were sung by Scherzinger with support from Melody Thornton, whilst the remaining group members are only credited for background vocals. Upon release, Doll Domination received mixed reviews from music critics. The album debuted at number four on the US Billboard 200 becoming the group's highest charting album. It experienced similar peaks in international territories, debuting at number three in Canada and number four in Australia and the United Kingdom. Doll Domination was later reissued in multiple versions throughout 2009. The album was supported with a world tour titled Doll Domination Tour in 2009.

The album was preceded by the release of the US Billboard Hot 100 top-ten single "When I Grow Up" and the UK top-ten hit "Whatcha Think About That" (featuring Missy Elliott). Other successful singles were "I Hate This Part", "Jai Ho! (You Are My Destiny)", and "Hush Hush; Hush Hush", all of which reached the top ten in numerous countries worldwide. Although "Jai Ho! (You Are My Destiny)" became a number-one hit in Australia, Ireland, Finland, among other countries, the single caused tension within the group as Scherzinger was billed as a featured artist. Despite their commercial success, unhappiness of Scherzinger's spotlight and prominence within the group grew leading to a public outburst by Thornton during the tour. In early 2010, the group disbanded to pursue solo projects, before reforming in 2019 with the promise of new music. In 2019, the R. Kelly collaboration "Out of This Club" was removed from digital retailers and streaming services, following the airing of the Surviving R. Kelly documentary and subsequent abuse allegations against the singer.

Background
The Pussycat Dolls's previous album PCD (2005),was a commercial success, selling up to 2.9 million records in the United States. The album featured three top ten hits, including the international breakthrough single "Don't Cha". The success brought the group a wide array of spin-offs,which included a CW reality series, Pussycat Dolls Present: The Search for the Next Doll (2007). EThe show was executively produced by the Pussycat Dolls founder Robin Antin, her brother Steven Antin, record executive Jimmy Iovine, and television producers McG and Ken Mok,. Thegoal of the show was ato dd a seventh member to the group who would join them in recording their second studio album and future tour endeavors. Its finale on April 24, 2007 revealed Asia Nitollano to be the winner of the competition. Following her win, she joined the group in a performance of their single "Don't Cha". However, several months later, it was revealed that Nitollano had actually quit the group shortly after the finale aired to pursue a solo career.

Over the course of two years (2005–07), lead singer Nicole Scherzinger recorded 75–100 songs for her planned solo debut album. In March 2007, Scherzinger announced that her debut studio album would be titled Her Name is Nicole and was initially scheduled for a release in late summer. In September 2007, Scherzinger released her debut single, "Baby Love" featuring will.i.am, achieving moderate success. After the lack of success of the other three singles: "Whatever U Like" (featuring T.I.), "Supervillain", and "'Puakenikeni", and a number of push backs, Scherzinger decided not to release any further singles, and at her request, Her Name is Nicole was shelved and shifted back focus back on the Pussycat Dolls's second album. Additionally, several songs recorded for Her Name is Nicole were given by Scherzinger to the Pussycat Dolls as she felt that the songs were better suited for the group.

On March 3, 2008, Carmit Bachar announced via the group's website that she had left the group intending to pursue a solo career. At the time of her departure, she had been the longest member of the group, joining in 1995 when they were a burlesque act. On March 10, they performed for the first time without Bachar for the Operation MySpace concert which honored US troops stationed in Kuwait.

On August 12, 2008, the group unveiled the album artwork for the standard edition of the album. The cover depicts each member on motorcycles that bears a medallion displaying their initials. Maura of Idolator saw the cover as a step for the four members besides Scherzinger "to finally break through and maybe, someday, have personalities of their own."

Musical styles and compositions
Doll Domination comprises sixteen tracks on the standard edition and twenty-one on the deluxe edition—five of which are songs credited to each individual member. In terms of musical composition, critics noted that it follows the same formula as their debut album; self-assuring themes, sultry lyrics and thumping dance beats.

The album opens up with "When I Grow Up" an uptempo R&B and electropop song which is centered around the desire to be famous when one grows up. Nic Oliver from musicOMH opined that the track "sets the template for the rest of the album." "Bottle Pop" which features Snoop Dogg consists of "breathy vocals, funky electronica and sexual innuendo." Whatcha Think About That" is a mid-tempo electropop and R&B song which is built around a distinctive bhangra-ish guitar riff. The song features three verses from American female rapper Missy Elliott who joins the group "for a boy-baiting session." The fourth track "I Hate This Part" is an emotive ballad speaking about the conversation before a breakup. "Takin' Over the World" "goes for these [girls] idea of global-pop" over "cool electro grooves." The sixth track, "Out of This Club" which features American singer R. Kelly and producer Polow da Don is "a slow jam" consisting of "rudimentary piano melodies" and a "plush beat against a romantic chorus." "Who's Gonna Love You", a leftover from Her Name Is Nicole, has been noted to have Janet Jackson influences, as well as "shimmering 80s gloss." In "Happily Never After" Scherzinger narrates the story of a woman who walks out on a dead-end relationship. "Magic" uses Middle Eastern rhythms.

Release and promotion

Doll Domination was first released in Germany on September 19, 2008. In their native country, the album was released on September 23, 2008. Six months after the original, Interscope Records released Doll Domination 2.0 in Australia on April 24, 2009. Doll Domination 2.0 features ten songs, including the remix of "Hush Hush; Hush Hush" and several newly recorded songs. Nick Bond of MTV Australia commented although "confusing [...] releasing a succinct package of the better songs from 'Doll Domination' is actually the smartest move they've made for a while." He ended the review writiby ng, "whileWit's looking increasingly unlikely that the group will survive to a third album, this mini-greatest hits makes for a fitting send-off."

On August 3, 2009, Doll Domination 3.0 was released in the UK using the original cover art. It includes all of the songs from the Standard Edition as well as songs from the Mini Collection. It does not include any of the solo songs from the original deluxe edition, nor "Lights, Camera, Action" (featuring New Kids on the Block) or "Top of the World".

Singles
The album's lead single "When I Grow Up" was released on May 27, 2008 and serviced to contemporary hit radio stations on June 1, 2008. The single was received favorably by contemporary music critics, many of whom highlighted it as a stand-out track from Doll Domination. The song peaked at number nine on the Billboard Hot 100, becoming the group's highest-charting single since "Buttons" (2006). The accompanying music video was nominated in five categories at the 2008 MTV Video Music Awards, and went on to win Best Dance Video.

"Whatcha Think About That", which features guest vocals by American recording artist Missy Elliott, was released and serviced to contemporary hit radio stations on September 9, 2008 as the second single. The song failed to enter the Billboard Hot 100, however it did manage to peak at number nine on the UK Singles Chart. The burlesque-inspired video was directed by Diane Martel and was released in October 6.

"Out of This Club", a collaboration between R. Kelly and Polow da Don, was sent to urban contemporary stations on October 12, 2008 as the third single in the United States. The song debuted and peaked at number 24 on the Billboard Bubbling Under R&B/Hip-Hop Singles, a component chart that represents the 25 songs that failed to make an impact on the Hot R&B/Hip-Hop Songs chart.

"I Hate This Part" was released on October 14, 2008 as the second international single and impacted contemporary hit radio stations on October 20, 2008 as the fourth single in the United States. The song received positive feedback from music critics, who commended the song's production and Scherzinger's vocals. The song peaked at number eleven on the US Billboard Hot 100 chart and topped the US Hot Dance Club Songs chart.  It additionally peaked within the top-ten of several international singles charts including in Australia and New Zealand. The accompanying music video was released on October 11, and was filmed in Los Angeles featuring a desert-themed concept.

On February 23, 2009, a remix of "Bottle Pop" was released in New Zealand replacing Snoop Dogg with Devolo. The version featuring Snoop Dogg was released on March 6 as the fourth single in Australia and some European countries. In Oceania, the song achieved a moderate success peaking within the top-twenty in Australia and New Zealand. In the United States, the song topped the Hot Dance Club Play chart.

Following A. R. Rahman's win at the 2009 Academy Awards for Best Original Song and Best Original Score for "Jai Ho" and the soundtrack of Slumdog Millionaire, the English pop version entitled "Jai Ho! (You Are My Destiny)" was released the day after. Nicole Scherzinger was credited as a featured artist, creating tension within the group. The track peaked at number fifteen on the Billboard Hot 100, after charging eighty-five places to make the largest weekly leap from number 100. Internationally, it achieved greater success across Europe and Oceania, reaching the top of the charts in 17 countries including Australia, Finland and Ireland. The accompanying music video recreated the last scene from the movie Slumdog Millionaire.

"Hush Hush; Hush Hush" was solicited to contemporary hit radio stations on May 26, 2009 as the final single of Doll Domination. The song peaked at number seventy-three and forty-one on the United States and Canada respectively. Internationally, the single reached number two in Turkey, ten in Australia, and the top twenty in most European countries. Additionally, the song went on to become the group's sixth consecutive number one on the Billboard Hot Dance Club Songs chart.

Live performances
The Pussycat Dolls first performed "When I Grow Up" on Jimmy Kimmel Live! on May 20, 2008, on June 1 at the 2008 MTV Movie Awards and on June 12 on So You Think You Can Dance. The album was additionally promoted through an episode of the documentary series E! True Hollywood Story, which premiered through E! on May 23 and hosted VH1's special Maxim Hot 100 on May 27. In August 2008, the Pussycat Dolls traveled to Asia to open the 2008 MTV Asia Awards in Kuala Lumpur, Malaysia, performing "Buttons" and "When I Grow Up" on August 2 and appeared on the second day of the Singfest music festival in Singapore on August 4. On August 29, they performed "When I Grow Up" on Today and several days later performed at the annual charity fundraiser event Fashion Rocks. The group then performed five songs at a Walmart Soundcheck showcase: "I Hate This Part", "Takin' Over the World" and "When I Grow Up" from Doll Domination, and "Buttons" and "Don't Cha" from PCD. Towards the end of September 2008 they traveled to the United Kingdom and performed "When I Grow Up" at the Vodafone Awards, GMTV, This Morning and the Sound and One Night Only and appeared on the covers of The Big Issue and QX.

On October 14, the group traveled to Australia to perform at the Sydney Opera House as part of a series of concerts promoting Xbox 360 and the video game Lips; the following day they performed a two-song set on Sunrise. On October 28, the group performed "Whatcha Think About That" along with Missy Elliott on Dancing with the Stars. On November 21, they performed a medley of "I Hate This Part" and "When I Grow Up" at the 2008 American Music Awards. The performance included stripper poles, and the girls donned all-rubber outfits. On December 12, the group performed "I Hate This Part" on The Hills Finale Live from NYC. The group went on to perform on January 7 on The Tonight Show with Jay Leno, on January 18 they performed along with "When I Grow Up" on the 2009 NRJ Music Awards in Cannes, France. The Pussycat Dolls first performed "Jai Ho! (You Are My Destiny)" for the first time on television on Late Night with Jimmy Fallon on March 10 wearing Indian-inspired outfits. Several days later they performed "Jai Ho! (You Are My Destiny)" and "I Hate This Part" on MuchOnDemand and on March 28 performed a medley of "Jai Ho! (You Are My Destiny)" and "When I Grow Up" at the Kids' Choice Awards.

Critical reception

At Metacritic, which assigns a normalized rating out of 100 to reviews from mainstream critics, the album received an average score of 51, which indicates "mixed or average reviews", based on 12 reviews. Writing for Billboard, Mariel Concepcion provided a favorable review, opining that the album has all "the elements (self-assuring themes, sultry lyrics and lots of skin-tight latex) to mimic the victory of [PCD]." Steve Jones of USA Today agreed with Concepcion, but added they are "more interested in pushing their brand than pushing boundaries". Writing for Slant Magazine, Sal Cinquemani found that "it was smart to spotlight the, talents of the other pussycats" following the cancellation of Her Name is Nicole. Writing for The Washington Post, Allison Stewart noted that Scherzinger has "more of a central role" and viewed Doll Domination as "a consolation prize" after the multiple delays on her solo album. Jon Pareles of The New York Times noted that the ballads "are a move toward expanding the franchise" seeking "a little empathy along with the attitude". In a more mixed review, Rolling Stones Christian Hoard singled out several songs but concluded that the record "sounds like the Dolls just threw everything they had against the charts to see if anything would stick."

Elan Priya of The Times wrote that the album "lacks any distinct personality". August Brown from the Los Angeles Times noted that the tracks don't come "within [the] sniffing distance of 'Don't Cha,' [...] Instead, they act out as a "a series of signifiers to other, more interesting, moments in recent pop culture." Likewise, Ken Capobianco of The Boston Globe stated that the album does not live up to their debut album PCD. Margeaux Watson of Entertainment Weekly graded the album a C− criticizing Doll Domination'''s longevity "especially for a group that brazenly emphasizes style over substance." Glenn Gamboa of Newsday wrote, "as far as music is concerned, they are not the dominators, they are the dominated," adding that "they sound like they are at the mercy of their songwriters and producers, making for huge swings in quality. Stephen Thomas Erlewine of AllMusic found it ironic that a group coming from a burlesque revue sings songs about "empowerment, heartbreak, love, fame and wealth, but never about sex." He ended his review writing, "it's a lot better to hear pinups sing a song of striptease than a song of love." Nic Oliver from musicOMH was also more negative of the record, opining that it is an "album heading straight for the bargain bins" under the file "dispiriting". Katie Toms of The Guardian criticised the album for being "aimed at five-year-old girls".

On his list of the five worst albums of 2008, Chris Willman from Entertainment Weekly placed Doll Domination fifth, criticizing the song's "double entendres" aimed at their "target audience of 15-year-olds". IGN ranked Doll Domination third on their list of the ten worst albums, commenting that it the "record stands out because it is so exceptionally retched." It was voted as the third worst album in the 2008 Popjustice Readers' Poll.

Commercial performance
In the United States, Doll Domination debuted at number-four on the Billboard 200 chart selling 79,000 copies in the week ending September 29, according to Nielsen Music. In addition, Doll Domination attained their highest peak on the Billboard 200 however, it also marked their lowest first week sales of an album, with PCD selling 99,000 copies. During its second week of release, Doll Domination dropped to number fourteen. According to Billboard, the album was a commercial disappointment in the U.S. selling less than 400,000 copies by April 2009 which led to the decision to re-release newer versions of the album including Doll Domination 2.0. In Canada, Doll Domination entered at number three on the albums chart with sales of 12,000 in the week ending October 11, 2008. The album managed to chart for only 5 weeks, and was certified platinum by the Music Canada for shipments exceeding 80,000 copies.

In the United Kingdom, the album debuted at number four on the UK Albums Chart dated September 28, 2008, selling 31,823 units and eclipsing the number eight debut (23,800 sales) and number seven peak of their debut album PCD. On November 28, 2008 the album was certified Gold by the British Phonographic Industry (BPI). As of May 2009, Doll Domination has sold a total of 205,881 copies in the UK—less than a sixth as many as the PCD, which has sold 1,246,769 copies. In France, Doll Domination debuted at number sixteen on the French Albums Chart on September 29, 2008, staying at that spot for two weeks. It has been certified Gold by the Syndicat National de l'Édition Phonographique.

Tour

During the summer of 2008, Ashley Roberts first mentioned the group's intentions to tour in 2009. In October the group announced the first set of dates in the United Kingdom with American R&B singer-songwriter Ne-Yo as an opening act in select UK dates. The following month more European dates were announced along with dates in Oceania for which American recording artist Lady Gaga was announced as the main opening act in both legs. The first leg of Doll Domination Tour began at the Aberdeen Exhibition and Conference Centre in Aberdeen, Scotland on January 18, 2009 and concluded on February 25 at the Belgrade Arena in Belgrade, Serbia. Before continuing in Oceania, the group opened for Britney Spears' Circus Tour in North America from March 3 to May 3. The tour resumed on May 16 at the Vector Arena in Auckland, New Zealand and concluded on July 31 at the Beirut International Exhibition & Leisure Center in Beirut, Lebanon. Jessica Sutta suffered a back injury during the first Sydney show, leaving the group performing as a foursome throughout the following shows. Twenty-three shows were submitted to Billboards boxscore grossing $14.3 million, with 231,711 fans attending the performances. During the tour, the group's dissatisfaction over Scherzinger's prominence led to a public outburst by Thornton. While opening for The Circus Starring Britney Spears (2009) in Glendale, Arizona, Melody Thornton addressed the crowd during their break saying, "[...] let me give a shout-out to my family. Thank you for supporting me, even if I'm not featured" referring to the billing of the song, and encouraging the audience to follow their dreams and to "never let anyone stomp on them, ever." Less than a year later, the group formerly disbanded following an initial hiatus.

Track listing
Original release

Re-releases

This re-release was also released in Germany as the "Re-edition" and featured the 'We Love to Entertain You' remix of "Takin' Over the World" as track 20.
In some territories, the version of "Jai Ho" included on the album is the "RF Remix".

Notes
 signifies a co-producer
 signifies a vocal producer
 signifies an additional producer
"When I Grow Up" samples "He's Always There" as written by Jim McCarty and Paul Samwell-Smith performed by the Yardbirds.
"Whatcha Think About That" samples "Je M'appelle Jane" as written by Mickael Furnon performed by Jane Birkin.
"Out of This Club" has been removed from digital stores and streaming services as of February, 2019 due to the sexual abuse allegations against R. Kelly.

Personnel
Credits adapted from the liner notes of Doll Domination''.

Performance credits

 Nicole Scherzinger – all lead vocals, background vocals
 Melody Thornton – additional lead vocals, background vocals
 Jessica Sutta – additional background vocals
 Ashley Roberts - additional vocals
 Kimberly Wyatt – additional vocals
 Snoop Dogg – vocals (track 2)
 Missy Elliott – vocals (track 3)
 R. Kelly – vocals (track 6)
 Polow Da Don – vocals (track 6), additional vocals (track 7)
 New Kids on the Block – vocals (track 6)
 Rodney "Darkchild" Jerkins – additional vocals (track 1)
 Rock City – additional vocals (track 1)
 Candice Nelson – additional background vocals (tracks 9–11, 15)
 Pino Palladino – bass guitar
 Greg Phillinganes – keyboards, additional background vocals
 Steve Jordan – drums
 Captain Kirk Douglas – guitar

Technical and production

 Julian Peploe – art direction
 Matthew Rolston – photography
 Rodney "Darkchild" Jerkins – production (tracks 1, 12), vocal production, mixing (track 1)
 Paul Foley – recording (track 1)
 Mike "Handz" Donaldson – recording (track 1)
 Roberto "Tito" Vazquez – recording (track 1)
 Spike Stent – mixing (track 1)
 Sean "The Pen Garrett – production, instrumentation, programming (track 2)
 Fernando Garibay – production, instrumentation, programming (track 2)
 Clubba Langg – co-production (track 2)
 Miles Walker – recording (track 2)
 Chris Jackson – recording (track 2)
 Mike Hogue – assistant recording (track 2)
 Chris Kasych – assistant recording (track 2)
 Brian Schunck – assistant recording (track 2)
 Matt Wheeler – assistant recording (track 2), recording (tracks 3, 5, 14)
 Kennard Garrett – keyboards (track 2)
 Raymond "Rayza" Oglesby – keyboards, additional drum programming (track 2)
 Tony Maserati – mixing (track 2)
 Jamal "Polow Da Don" Jones – production (tracks 3, 7, 17)
 Ron Fair – production (tracks 4, 13, 16), vocal production (tracks 3, 4, 7, 13), string arrangement and conduct (tracks 3, 7, 13, 16), vocal arrangement (track 7) wind chimes (track 16)
 Ester Dean – vocal production (track 3)
 Mike "Angry" Eleopoulos – recording (tracks 3, 4, 13, 16) 
 Tal Herzberg – recording (tracks 3, 4, 13), Pro Tools (tracks 3, 4, 13, 16) co-production (track 16)
 Tony Terrebonne – recording (track 3)
 Aubry "Big Juice" Delaine – recording (track 3)
 Tony Terrebonne – recording (track 3)
 Johnathan Merritt – assistant recording (tracks 3, 4)
 Bryan Morton – assistant recording (track 3)
 Jason Perry – keyboards (track 3)
 Melvin Jones – trumpet (track 3)
 Lissy Rosemond – banjo (track 3)
 Eric Florence – tuba (track 3)
 Dave Pensado – mixing (tracks 3–5, 12–14)
 Jaycen Joshua – mixing (tracks 3–5, 12–14)
 Andrew Wuepper – mixing assistant (tracks 3, 13)
 Jonas Jeberg – production, recording, instruments, programming (track 4)
 Peter Mokran – mixing (tracks 4, 7)
 Eric Weaver – mixing assistant (tracks 4, 7)
 Chase N Cashe – production (tracks 5, 14)
 Daniel Groover – guitars (track 5)
 R. Kelly – production, arrangement, mixing assistant (track 6)
 Ian Mereness – recording, programming (track 6)
 Abel Garibaldi – recording (track 6)
 Jeff Meeks – recording, programming (track 6)
 Eric Schlotzer – recording, programming (track 6)
 Donnie Lyle – guitars (track 6)
 Patrick Hayes – guitars (track 6)
 Eric Schlotzer – recording, programming (track 6)
 Donnie Lyle – guitars (track 6)
 Patrick Hayes – guitars (track 6)
 Steve Baughman – recording (track 7)
 Tony Terrebone – recording (track 7)
 Nicole Scherzinger – vocal arrangement (track 7)
 Shea Taylor – production (track 8)
 Shaffer "Ne-Yo" Smith – co-production (track 8)
 Mike Tocci – recording (track 8)
 Daniel Laporte – additional recording (track 8)
 Moses "Big Mo" Laporte – additional recording (track 8)
 Robert "R.T." Taylor – acoustic guitar (track 8)
 Bart Bucsko – electric guitar (track 8)
 Glenn Kamp – drums (track 8)
 Kevin "KD" Davis – mixing (track 8)
 Timbaland – production (tracks 9–11, 14)
 Jerome "Jroc" Harmon – production (tracks 9–11, 14)
 Chris Godbey – recording, mixing (tracks 9–11, 14)
 Julian Vasquez – recording (tracks 9–11, 14)
 Fareed Salamah – recording (tracks 9–11, 14)
 Ron Taylor – additional pro-tools editing (tracks 9–11, 14)
 Dan Warner – additional guitars (tracks 10, 11)
 Lashawn Daniels – vocal production (track 12)
 Jordan Omley – vocal production (track 12)
 Tito Vasquez – recording (track 12)
 Mike "Handz" Donaldson – recording (track 12)
 Paul Foley – recording (track 12)
 Quiz & Larossi – production, instruments, programming (track 13)
 Frank Wolf – strings recording (track 13)
 Jonathan Merrit – assistant engineers (tracks 13, 16)
 Keith Gretlein – assistant engineers (track 13)
 Greg De Pante – assistant engineers (track 13)
 Hit-Boy – productions (track 14)
 Kara Dioguardi – co-production (track 14)
 Allen Sides – string recording (track 16)
 Ryan Shanahan – assistant engineers (track 16)
 Mike Houge – assistant engineers (track 16)
 Gary Grin – piano (track 16)
 Gary Novak – piano (track 16)
 John Goux – guitar (track 16)
 Rusty Anderson – guitar (track 16)
 Jack Joseph Puig – mixing (track 16)
 Dean Nelson – mixing assistant (track 16)
 Nelly – vocal production (track 17)
 Adam Messinger – vocal production (track 17)

Charts

Weekly charts

2008 Year-end charts

2009 Year-end charts

Certifications and sales

Release history

References

External links
 

The Pussycat Dolls albums
2008 albums
Albums produced by Hit-Boy
Albums produced by R. Kelly
Albums produced by Rodney Jerkins
Albums produced by Polow da Don
Albums produced by Ron Fair
Albums produced by Sean Garrett
Albums produced by Timbaland
Albums produced by Ne-Yo
Albums produced by Cutfather
Interscope Records albums
Interscope Geffen A&M Records albums
Albums produced by Fernando Garibay